Keel Mountain is a mesa in Madison and Jackson Counties in Alabama.  It is associated with the Cumberland Plateau, which it is separated from by the valley of the Paint Rock River. It is named for early pioneers Jesse and Priscilla (Whitaker) Keel, who settled there from North Carolina prior to 1810.

References

Landforms of Jackson County, Alabama
Landforms of Madison County, Alabama
Mountains of Alabama